Arsen Mgerovich Ayrapetyan (born 16 February 1997) is a Russian football player of Armenian descent. He plays for Armenian club FC Noah on loan from FC Rodina Moscow.

Club career
He made his debut in the Russian Football National League for FC Shinnik Yaroslavl on 17 August 2015 in a game against FC Arsenal Tula.

References

External links
 Profile by Russian Football National League

1997 births
Russian people of Armenian descent
Footballers from Yaroslavl
Living people
Russian footballers
Association football midfielders
FC Shinnik Yaroslavl players
FC Znamya Truda Orekhovo-Zuyevo players
FC Ararat Moscow players
FC Noah players
Russian First League players
Russian Second League players
Armenian Premier League players
Russian expatriate footballers
Expatriate footballers in Armenia
Russian expatriate sportspeople in Armenia